William de Mugge was the Archdeacon of Barnstaple during 1358.

References

Archdeacons of Barnstaple